Castelfranco di Sopra is a frazione (parish) of the comune of Castelfranco Piandiscò, in the Province of Arezzo in the Italian region of Tuscany.

It was an autonomous comune until 1 January 2014, when it was merged with Pian di Scò to form the new comune of Castelfranco Piandiscò. 
 

 

Frazioni of the Province of Arezzo
Populated places established in the 13th century
1299 establishments in Europe
13th-century establishments in Italy
2014 disestablishments in Italy